An England team toured Australia between November 1920 and March 1921.  The tour was organised by the Marylebone Cricket Club and matches outside the Tests were played under the MCC name.  The tour itinerary consisted of 13 first-class matches, including a series of 5 Test matches against Australia in which The Ashes were at stake.

Tour review
The tour was the first to have Test status after the First World War. It followed tours by the Australian Imperial Forces cricket team which played a number of first-class matches in England, South Africa and Australia immediately after the war. The last Ashes series had been the 1912 Triangular Tournament held in England that year.

Although the tourists were relatively successful in their first-class matches against the Australian state teams, losing only one, the Test series "resulted, as everyone knows, in disaster" and England became the first team ever to lose every match in a five-Test series.

Wisden commented that the chief cause of England's failure was the bowling, because all of the bowlers used were expensive and recorded high averages. Much has been made of Australia's ability to recover from the effects of the war more quickly than England and Wisden commented that "English cricket had not had time to regain its pre-war standard".

Test series summary

First Test

Second Test

Third Test

Fourth Test

Fifth Test

Summary of other first-class matches
 South Australia (Adelaide Oval) — MCC won by an innings and 55 runs
 Victoria (Melbourne Cricket Ground) —  MCC won by an innings and 59 runs
 New South Wales (Sydney Cricket Ground) —  New South Wales won by 6 wickets
 Queensland (Brisbane Exhibition Ground) —  MCC won by an innings and 41 runs
 Australian XI (Brisbane Exhibition Ground) —  match drawn
 Victoria (Melbourne Cricket Ground) —  MCC won by 7 wickets
 New South Wales (Sydney Cricket Ground) —  match drawn
 South Australia (Adelaide Oval) —  MCC won by an innings and 63 runs

England touring party
The England touring party consisted of 16 players led by Essex all-rounder Johnny Douglas.

When the party was originally selected, Reggie Spooner was invited to be the team captain but he was obliged to stand down for domestic reasons.  Vallance Jupp had been selected too but was unable to travel.  Jupp's withdrawal was shortly before departure and meant that his replacement Bill Hitch had to catch a later boat than the main party.  There was another withdrawal when Jack Hearne was taken ill during the Second Test and could not play again that season.

There was a controversy over Rockley Wilson who sent match reports by cable to the Daily Express.  As a result, MCC resolved at a meeting the following May to bar players from reporting on matches in which they were involved.

All-rounders
 Johnny Douglas, Essex (captain)
 Percy Fender, Surrey
 J W Hearne, Middlesex
 Wilfred Rhodes, Yorkshire
 Rockley Wilson, Yorkshire
 Frank Woolley, Kent

Batsmen
 Patsy Hendren, Middlesex
 Jack Hobbs, Surrey
 Harry Makepeace, Lancashire
 Jack Russell, Essex

Bowlers
 Bill Hitch, Surrey
 Harry Howell, Warwickshire
 Cec Parkin, Lancashire
 Abe Waddington, Yorkshire

Wicketkeepers
 Arthur Dolphin, Yorkshire
 Bert Strudwick, Surrey

Australian players in Test series
Australia used 14 players in the Test series.  Eight players took part in all five matches including the captain Warwick Armstrong.

All-rounders
 Warwick Armstrong, Victoria (captain)
 Charles Kelleway, New South Wales
 Jack Gregory, New South Wales

Batsmen
 Warren Bardsley, New South Wales
 Herbie Collins, New South Wales
 Charlie Macartney, New South Wales
 Roy Park, Victoria
 Nip Pellew, South Australia
 Jack Ryder, Victoria
 Johnny Taylor, New South Wales

Bowlers
 Ted McDonald, Victoria
 Arthur Mailey, New South Wales

Wicketkeepers
 Sammy Carter, New South Wales
 Bert Oldfield, New South Wales

Ceylon
The English team had a stopover in Colombo en route to Australia and played a one-day single-innings match there against the Ceylon national team, which at that time did not have Test status.

References

Further reading
 Bill Frindall, The Wisden Book of Test Cricket 1877-1978, Wisden, 1979
 Chris Harte, A History of Australian Cricket, Andre Deutsch, 1993
 Ray Robinson, On Top Down Under, Cassell, 1975
 Wisden Cricketers' Almanack 1922

External links
 Wisden online: tour review
 CricketArchive tour itinerary
 Tour index at Cricinfo

1920 in English cricket
1920 in Australian cricket
1920 in Ceylon
1921 in English cricket
1921 in Australian cricket
1920-21
1920
Australian cricket seasons from 1918–19 to 1944–45
International cricket competitions from 1918–19 to 1945
Sri Lankan cricket seasons from 1880–81 to 1971–72
1920-21